The 1987 Australian Touring Car season was the 28th year of touring car racing in Australia since the first runnings of the Australian Touring Car Championship and the forerunner of the present-day Bathurst 1000, the Armstrong 500.

There were 16 touring car race meetings held during 1987: a nine-round series, the 1987 Australian Touring Car Championship (ATCC); a support programme event at the 1987 Australian Grand Prix; and six long-distance races, nicknamed 'enduros', two of which were rounds of the one-off 1987 World Touring Car Championship (WTCC).

For the first time, the ATCC had a major series sponsor in the form of oil company Shell, who provided some AU$275,000 in prize money (previously teams and drivers had received as little as $1,250 for an ATCC round win).

Results and standings

Race calendar
The 1987 Australian touring car season consisted of 16 events.

Australian Touring Car Championship

Australian Manufacturers' Championship

Australian 2.0 Litre Touring Car Championship

Hardie Irrigation 100

Yokohama/Bob Jane T-Marts 300

Pepsi 250

Castrol 500

World Touring Car Championship

James Hardie 1000

Bob Jane T-Marts 500

South Pacific Touring Car Championship 
This race was a support event of the 1987 Australian Grand Prix. Top 10 results shown.

References

External links
 Official V8 Supercar site

Australian Touring Car Championship
Touring Cars